Croatian singer-songwriter Mia Dimšić has released three studio albums, one extended play (EP) and 18 singles. 

Dimšić's debut studio album Život nije siv was released in March 2017 and peaked at number one on the Top of the Shops in Croatia. The album is certified gold in Croatia. The album's lead single "Život nije siv" peaked at number three on the Croatian HR Top 40 chart and spawned two number one singles; "Bezimeni" and "Sunce, oblak, vjetar". Dimšić released her second studio album Božićno jutro in November 2017 and peaked at number two in Croatia. "Cimet i čaj", the albums lead and most successful single peaked at number one in Croatia. 

In December 2019, her third studio album, Sretan put, was released. It was her second album to debut at number one on the Croatian albums chart. The album produced three number one singles: "Ovaj grad", "Cesta do sna" and "Sva blaga ovog svijeta".

Albums

Studio albums

Extended plays

Singles

As lead artist

As featured artist

Videography

Music videos

Notes

References

Discographies of Croatian artists
Pop music discographies